Giovanni Bia (born 24 October 1968) is a former Italian footballer who played as a defender.

He made his Serie A debut on 5 April 1992 with Parma in a 1–1 draw against Cagliari. He also played for Napoli, Inter, Bologna, Udinese and Brescia. During the 1992–93 season, he played in Serie B with Cosenza. It was a very successful season that proved to be a breakthrough for Bia when he was recruited by Napoli, whose manager at the time was Marcello Lippi. His most successful seasons were probably from 1995 to 1997 when he played for Udinese, under the guidance of Alberto Zaccheroni, and also the three seasons he played for Bologna. In his career, he also wore the colours of Perugia (Serie C1 and C2), Trento (C1) and Reggiana (C1), in addition to that of Ligue 2 side Saint Etienne in France.

In total, he made 194 appearances in Serie A, scoring 15 goals.

He is currently the agent of players such as Luca Cigarini, Daniele Dessena and Federico Macheda.

References

External links

1968 births
Living people
Italian footballers
Italian expatriate footballers
Serie A players
Serie B players
Serie C players
Ligue 2 players
Parma Calcio 1913 players
A.C. Perugia Calcio players
A.C. Trento 1921 players
S.S.C. Napoli players
Inter Milan players
Udinese Calcio players
Brescia Calcio players
Bologna F.C. 1909 players
AS Saint-Étienne players
A.C. Reggiana 1919 players
Cosenza Calcio 1914 players
Expatriate footballers in France
Association football defenders